Central Local School District, also known as Central Local Schools, is a school district in Defiance County, Ohio, United States. It operates three schools:
Fairview High School, Fairview Middle School, and Fairview Elementary School. The district's superintendent is Steve Arnold.

Fairview Elementary School
Fairview Elementary School is located on 14060 Blosser Road in rural Sherwood, Ohio.  The school's principal is Sherri Brown. Fairview opened for the first time during the 2002–2003 school year, replacing Sherwood Elementary and Farmer Elementary schools as the elementary school in the Central Local School District. Go to http://www.centrallocal.org/apaches/ to learn more.

References

Education in Defiance County, Ohio
School districts in Ohio